, meaning Tokyo Children Club, is an early childhood education program published in Japan in an audio-visual format, distributed monthly on a record. The 7-inch record contained stories and songs, accompanied by a picture book that could be bound in a special folder. The early-childhood education program came in two courses: a 2-4 year old course and a 5-7 year old course. Each of the courses was designed to complete in 12 months. In addition on a quarterly basis, the Club sent out supplemental stories, songs and other music on a 12-inch record. The records were monaural recordings at 33-1/3 rpm. Presently, the recordings have gone out of print, making their procurement quite difficult.

Programs
The programs were designed to familiarize children with stories and songs from around the world, with emphasis on European orchestral works. Main story narration often featured Classical music as a background music in order to help set the tone of the story. The bullets found in the index to each lesson were color-coded: red for the main story, blue for the songs and yellow for the occasional extra story. In the original course series, the main stories and songs were bulleted with a star and the extra stories with a circle. However, in later course series, they switched their bullets to red circles, blue squares and yellow triangles, keeping the same color code as before.

General Courses

2-4 year old Basic Course

2-4 year old Graduation

2-4 year old Graduate Course

5-7 year old Basic Course

5-7 year old Graduation

5-7 year old Graduate Course

Quarterly supplements

Seasons series

The Purple Flowers

Let's sing with Dad

Uncle's Pastures

Kodomo Concert Hall
The Kodomo Concert Hall series were recordings of the Tokyo Symphony Orchestra.

Uncle Kōji's Story Bag

Sing in English Group
The Tokyo Kodomo Club issued two courses of children’s songs in English for the Japanese audience in the  series. These songs were sung by Esther Ghan and her children. The  course was designed similarly to their Japanese courses, where the lesson units were distributed monthly on a record. Each of the courses was designed to complete in 12 months, with the course set spanning two years. For the older children,  in a set of six lesson units and a Christmas supplement were provided. It also spanned over two years.

Let’s Sing English Songs (1)

Let’s Sing English Songs (2)

Folk-album for All (1)

Folk-album for All (2)

Other
 : Spring, Summer.

Contact information
Original Address:
 Tokyo Kodomo Club15-5 Hachiyama-chōShibuya-ku, Tōkyō, Japan 〒150-0035
 Postal transfer: Tokyo 5-88764

Current address:
 Tokyo Kodomo Club12-4 Asahi-chōHachiōji-shi, Tōkyō, Japan 〒192-0083

See also

 Disney Read-Along

External links
 Biography of Esther Ghan who provided the voice for songs in English
 (Japanese) Jacket art on the quarterly supplement albums found towards the bottom of the page at the section titled 『東京こどもクラブ』

Books by type
Children's literature organizations
Japanese record labels
Children's music